The 2019 Spain Masters (officially known as the Barcelona Spain Masters 2019) was a badminton tournament which took place at the Pavelló de la Vall d'Hebron in Barcelona, Spain, from 19 to 24 February 2019 with a total prize purse of $150,000.

Tournament
The 2019 Spain Masters was the fourth tournament of the 2019 BWF World Tour and also part of the Spain Masters championships, which had been held since 2018. This tournament was organized by the Spanish Badminton Federation and was sanctioned by the BWF.

Venue
This international tournament was held at the Pavelló de la Vall d'Hebron in Barcelona, Spain.

Point distribution
Below is the point distribution table for each phase of the tournament based on the BWF points system for the BWF World Tour Super 300 event.

Prize money
The total prize money for this tournament was US$150,000. Distribution of prize money was in accordance with BWF regulations.

Men's singles

Seeds

 Viktor Axelsen (champion)
 Rasmus Gemke (withdrew)
 Anders Antonsen (final)
 Lu Guangzu (withdrew)
 Jan Ø. Jørgensen (first round)
 Wang Tzu-wei (quarter-finals)
 Hans-Kristian Vittinghus (second round)
 Rajiv Ouseph (quarter-finals)

Finals

Top half

Section 1

Section 2

Bottom half

Section 3

Section 4

Women's singles

Seeds

 Han Yue (semi-finals)
 Mia Blichfeldt (champion)
 Cai Yanyan (semi-finals)
 Line Kjærsfeldt (final)
 Li Xuerui (second round)
 Chen Xiaoxin (first round)
 Kirsty Gilmour (first round)
 Sayaka Sato (withdrew)

Finals

Top half

Section 1

Section 2

Bottom half

Section 3

Section 4

Men's doubles

Seeds

 Kim Astrup / Anders Skaarup Rasmussen (quarter-finals)
 Marcus Ellis / Chris Langridge (quarter-finals)
 Mathias Boe / Carsten Mogensen (semi-finals)
 Lu Ching-yao / Yang Po-han (semi-finals)
 Lee Yang / Wang Chi-lin (champions)
 Ou Xuanyi / Ren Xiangyu (withdrew)
 Mark Lamsfuß / Marvin Seidel (quarter-finals)
 Kim Won-ho / Seo Seung-jae (final)

Finals

Top half

Section 1

Section 2

Bottom half

Section 3

Section 4

Women's doubles

Seeds

 Gabriela Stoeva / Stefani Stoeva (semi-finals)
 Nami Matsuyama / Chiharu Shida (final)
 Maiken Fruergaard / Sara Thygesen (withdrew)
 Chow Mei Kuan / Lee Meng Yean (quarter-finals)
 Ni Ketut Mahadewi Istarani / Rizki Amelia Pradipta (withdrew)
 Kim So-yeong / Kong Hee-yong (champions)
 Émilie Lefel / Anne Tran (quarter-finals)
 Ekaterina Bolotova / Alina Davletova (second round)

Finals

Top half

Section 1

Section 2

Bottom half

Section 3

Section 4

Mixed doubles

Seeds

 Mathias Christiansen / Christinna Pedersen (first round)
 Marcus Ellis / Lauren Smith (semi-finals)
 Seo Seung-jae / Chae Yoo-jung (champions)
 Mark Lamsfuß / Isabel Herttrich (first round)
 Tontowi Ahmad / Winny Oktavina Kandow (quarter-finals)
 Nipitphon Phuangphuapet / Savitree Amitrapai (second round)
 Niclas Nøhr / Sara Thygesen (withdrew)
 Marvin Seidel / Linda Efler (first round)

Finals

Top half

Section 1

Section 2

Bottom half

Section 3

Section 4

References

External links
 Tournament Link

Spain Masters
Spain Masters
Spain Masters
Sports competitions in Barcelona
Spain Masters